Growth arrest-specific 5 is a non-protein coding RNA that in humans is encoded by the GAS5 gene.

GAS5 noncoding RNA, which accumulates in growth arrested cells, acts as a decoy hormone response element for the glucocorticoid receptor (GR) and hence blocks the upregulation of gene expression by activated GR.

A number of studies have linked GAS5 to apoptosis and it may play a role in the progression of some types of cancer.

The GAS5 introns host several snoRNA sequences, including SNORD81, SNORD47, SNORD80, SNORD79, SNORD78, SNORD44, SNORD77, SNORD76, SNORD75 and SNORD74. These intronic sequences are more conserved than the exons of the host gene, these sorts of genes are often called "inside-out genes".

It was recently discovered that the nonsense-mediated degradation pathway can regulate the function of the GAS5 in mammalian cells.

References

Further reading